Sysax FTP Automation is a Secure file transfer automation program for the Windows operating system. It consists of a script generation wizard, script editor and debugger, and a task scheduler. It also contains a secure command line FTP Client program called sysaxftp.exe that is a secure drop-in replacement for the ftp.exe command line program. In addition to FTP, secure file transfer using SSL/TLS (FTPS) and SSH2 (SFTP) are supported. The software is certified for Windows Vista, and tested to be compatible with Windows 7. The software is also certified for Windows Server 2012 and runs on all 32 and 64 bit editions of Windows from Windows 2000/Windows XP to Windows 8/Windows Server 2012. The Personal edition of the software is free for non-commercial use.

Features
 Protocols supported include FTP, FTPS, and SFTP
 Support for public key authentication and client side SSL certificates
 Support for email notification
 Open PGP Encryption and decryption support
 Supports file resuming for both uploads and downloads
 File compression and decompression
 Command line FTP tool and FTP scripting
 Script generation wizard and script editor with integrated debugger
 Task Scheduler that runs as a Windows Service
 Certified for Windows Vista
 Certified for Windows Server 2012

See also
Comparison of FTP client software
Sysax Multi Server

References

External links
Official website
Sysax FTP Automation User Forum
Sysax FTP Automation FAQ

FTP clients